Terry Smith (6 February 1959 – 19 September 2006) was an Australian rules footballer in the Victorian Football League.

Smith was recruited from Tyntynder (a small town near Swan Hill) and debuted with the Richmond Football Club in 1980. He tasted success immediately, being part of Richmond's 1980 premiership side playing off half-back.

In 1983 he moved to the St Kilda Football Club where he made a name for himself as a ruck-rover, and after three seasons with the Saints, he returned to Richmond for his final VFL season in 1986. He played 100 VFL games in total, 56 with the Tigers and 44 with the Saints.

Smith died on 19 September 2006 from cancer, aged 47. He was described by Tigers teammate Michael Roach as "one of those blokes people liked to be around and liked to have a beer with".

References

Sources
 Hogan P., The Tigers Of Old, Richmond F.C., Melbourne, 1996

1959 births
2006 deaths
Australian rules footballers from Victoria (Australia)
Deaths from cancer in Australia
Richmond Football Club players
Richmond Football Club Premiership players
St Kilda Football Club players
One-time VFL/AFL Premiership players